Alesia may refer to:

Places

France
 Alesia (city), an ancient city in Gaul
 Alésia (Paris Métro), a station in the Paris Métro
 Rue d'Alésia, Paris
 Le quartier Alésia, an unofficial district of Paris that mostly overlaps Petit-Montrouge

United States
 Alesia (Broussard, Louisiana), listed on the NRHP
 Alesia, Maryland, an unincorporated community

People 

 Alesia Fieldberg, Canadian television journalist and beauty pageant winner
 Alesia Furs (1925–2017), member of the Belarusian independence movement
 Alésia Glidewell, American web series director, producer and voice actress
 Alesia Graf (born 1980), German boxer
 Alesia Holliday, American author
 Alesia Raut, Indian-Russian model, VJ, and fashion choreographer
 Alesia Stepaniuk (born 1985), Russian Paralympic judoka
 Alesia Turava (born 1979), Belarusian middle-distance runner
 Alesia Zaitsava (born 1985), Belarusian badminton player

Other uses
 Battle of Alesia
 , a French ocean liner in service 1882–1899
 "Alesia", a song by Swiss folk metal band Eluveitie on their 2012 album Helvetios
 "Alésia", a 2011 album by French synth-pop band Housse de Racket
 "Alesia", an electronic music group signed to Owsla and Ultra Records
 Caesar (game), a board game originally published under the name Alesia

See also
 Alesya (disambiguation)
 Alessia
 Olesya (given name)